Karvy Group is a financial services company in India. It was involved in financial services like equity, commodities trading, depository and wealth services and distribution of other financial products. It has its headquarters in Hyderabad. It also had branch offices outside India in Bahrain, Dubai, Malaysia, Philippines and the United States. Scams perpetrated during 2019 involving Karvy Stock Broking Limited(KSBL), a group company  led to the filing of criminal cases against the Chairman and others. This led to the banning of  KSBL by the regulator.

History 

Karvy Group was established in the year 1983  and was headed by  C. Parthasarathy as Chairman. The group at one time had more than 30,000 employees, spanning 900 offices in about 400 cities and towns. In the mid-1990s, Karvy forayed into stockbroking and advisory businesses. Later, in the early 2000s, Karvy Corporate ventured into commodity trading. With the introduction of currency trading, Karvy Corporate was also in the business of Forex trading.

Business 

Karvy Group provided financial services like finance, insurance, broking, investment banking, loans for individuals and businesses. Karvy started its ecommerce business on Karvyclick.com to enable small and medium enterprises to go online for selling their products in various eCommerce platforms.

Karvy Data Management Services, a subsidiary of Karvy Group, has acquired the call center business of Media Matrix Worldwide Ltd for Rs 30 crore in 2017.

Karvy Group has following nineteen subsidiary companies under it.

 Karvy Stock Broking Ltd. (KSBL)- Equity Broking, Depository Participant, Distribution of Financial Products (Mutual Funds, FD and Bonds), Wealth Management Services, Currency Derivatives, Portfolio Management Services
 Karvy Comtrade Ltd. - Commodities Broking
 Karvy Capital Ltd. - NBFC & Portfolio Manager
 Karvy Investment Advisory Services Ltd. - Investment Advisory Services
 Karvy Holdings Ltd. - Core Investment Company
 Karvy Middle East LLC - Wealth Management Products for NRI’s
 Karvy Realty (India) Ltd. - Realty Services
 Karvy Financial Services Ltd.  - Non Banking Financial Services
 Karvy Insurance Repository Ltd. - Insurance Repository services
 Karvy Forex & Currencies Private Ltd. - Currency and forex services
 Karvy Consultants Ltd.  - Consultancy and Advisory Services, Publications
 Karvy Data Management Services Ltd. - Data Management Services
 Karvy Investor Services Ltd. - Merchant Banking and Corporate Finance
 Karvy Insights Ltd. - Market Research
 Karvy Analytics Ltd. - Analytics
 Karvy Solar Power Ltd. - Power Generation
 Karvy Global Services Ltd. - Business Process Outsourcing
 Karvy Global Services Inc, USA - Business Process Outsourcing
 Karvy Inc, USA

Divested companies
 Karvy FinTech (name changed to KFinTech after divesting)

Awards and Recognitions 

Chairman of the diversified financial services group - Karvy, C. Parthasarathy received the ‘Entrepreneur of the Year’ 2017 award from the Telangana government. The award was given for his contribution to IT sector in the state apart from employment generation.

Criminal cases involving Karvy group companies 
In November 2019, Securities and Exchange Board of India barred Karvy Stock Broking Limited (KSBL) from purchasing shares in delivery and also accepting new clients pending a forensic audit. SEBI found out that Karvy had defaulted Rs. 2000 crore of investor funds by pledging the securities holdings of its customers. The action was based on a detailed report by National Stock Exchange. The company had sold excess securities (not available in their DP account) worth Rs 485 crore through nine related clients till 31 May 2019. They further transferred excess securities worth Rs 162 crore to six of the nine related clients until 31 May 2019. Later, it tried to repurchase the securities worth 228.07 crores to cover up for the shortfall between June - September 2019. An amount of 1096 crore was transferred to its group concern Karvy Realty Private Limited during the period of April 2016 - October 2019.

In related investigation, Enforcement Directorate arrested C. Parthasarathy on 27 Jan 2022.  They were released on bail subsequently.

On 25 November 2022, a fresh criminal case was registered against  C. Parthasarathy, the Chairman of  Karvy Reality (India) Private Limited for cheating few investors from Kolkata and Kerala by engaging to sell plots  in 2019, in an old real estate venture of 2009.

References 

Financial services companies of India
Indian companies established in 1983
Companies based in Hyderabad, India
1983 establishments in Andhra Pradesh
Financial services companies established in 1983